Rumbek Center County is an administrative area (county) located in Lakes State, South Sudan. In August 2016, the former Rumbek Center County had split to create Amongping County, Malek County and Rumbek County.

References

Counties of South Sudan